Nikolaus Georg Gustav von Rauch (6 July 1851, in Berlin – 28 July 1904, in Stolp) was an Oberst and cavalry officer in the Prussian Army.

Life 
Nikolaus von Rauch was born in Berlin. Following his family's tradition he entered the Prussian Army in 1870. He served in the Franco-Prussian War in which he was promoted to Second-Leutnant and awarded the Iron Cross (second class). Later he became adjutant of the 15th Cavalry Brigade and then of the 11th Division in Breslau. In 1893 Rauch was a squadron commander in the 16th (2nd Hannover) Dragoon Regiment in Lüneburg. On April 4, 1899, Rauch became the commander of the 5th (Pomeranian) Hussar Regiment. He was part of Prussia's military delegation to the funeral of Queen Victoria in 1901. By March 1902 Rauch had been promoted to Oberst. From 1904 until his death he commanded the 29th Cavalry Brigade. He died in Stolp in Pomerania.

Nikolaus
1851 births
1904 deaths
German military personnel of the Franco-Prussian War
Recipients of the Iron Cross (1870), 2nd class
Prussian Army personnel
Military personnel from Berlin